The Mosque of the El Jebel Shrine, which has also been known as the Rocky Mountain Consistory, and as the Scottish Rite Temple  is a historic building in the North Capitol Hill neighborhood of downtown Denver.  It was for a period known as Sherman Street Event Center

The Moorish-inspired building was constructed in 1907, as a meeting hall for the El Jabel chapter of the Ancient Arabic Order of the Nobles of the Mystic Shrine (the Shriners). It has never been a true mosque in the Islamic sense.  In 1924, having outgrown the building, the Shriners sold it to the Scottish Rite Masons, who renamed it. In 1995, the Scottish Rite sold the building to Eulipions, Inc. who converted it into a catering and events facility.

It was known as the Scottish Rite Temple despite the fact that it never served as a Scottish Rite meeting hall.

See also
Masonic Temple Building, at 1614 Welton St. in Denver's central business district

References

Buildings and structures in Denver
Clubhouses on the National Register of Historic Places in Colorado
Former Masonic buildings in Colorado
Masonic buildings completed in 1907
National Register of Historic Places in Denver
Shriners